The Scout and Guide movement in Barbados is served by
 The Girl Guides Association of Barbados, member of the World Association of Girl Guides and Girl Scouts
 Barbados Boy Scouts Association, member of the World Organization of the Scout Movement

See also